Shekhar Sen is a singer, a music composer, a lyricist, and an actor.

Sen is famous for his monoact musical plays that he researched, written, composed, enacted, and directed: "Tulsi", "Kabeer", "Vivekanand", "Saahab" & "Soordas".

Early life 
Sen was born in 1961 and raised in a Bengali family in Raipur, Chhattisgarh. His father, the late Dr. Arun Kumar Sen, who was the Vice-Chancellor at Indira Kala Sangeet Vishwavidyalaya, Khairagarh, and mother late Dr. Aneeta Sen, were both renowned classical singers of Gwalior Gharana and Musicologists. He learned music from his parents, moved to Mumbai in 1979 to become music composer, and began singing in 1984. He started doing research oriented musical programs, such as Dushywant Ne Kaha Tha 1984 (ghazals of Dushyant Kumar), Madhya Yugeen Kaavya 1985 (sang medieval poets like Raskhan, Raheem, Lalitkishori, Bhooshan, Bihari, Kabir, Tulsidas, Sur Pakistan ka Hindi Kavya1986 (Hindi Geet, Dohe written in Pakistan), Meera Se Mahadevi Tak 1987 (Hindi songs by Poetesses) & many more innovative programmes.

Career 
Sen started his career in Mumbai in 1979, with the objective of becoming a music composer. He was contracted by HMV as a ghazal singer. He soon realized that his true talent lay in composing bhajans so he shifted to that, rendering more than 200 Bhajan Albums since 1983 as singer, a lyricist, and a composer. He sang and composed for many TV serials and films. He has performed more than 1200 concerts, singing all over the world.

Since 1998, as a playwright, actor, singer, director and composer, Sen has created one man musical plays and performed more than 1000 shows of his Mono Act Musical Plays, "Tulsi", "Kabeer"  "Vivekananda" "Sanmati",  "Saahab" & "Soordas". His performances received great acclaim in India as well as abroad such as US, England, Belgium, Suriname, Singapore, Jakarta, Hong Kong, Johannesburg, Sharjah, Mauritius, and Trinidad.

Sen's play, a mono-act "Soordas", premiered at NCPA Mumbai on 14 June 2013. Sen told Timeout Mumbai, "Initially, I was very apprehensive about whether to portray a blind person for two hours – a very tough task. But when I started writing [the play] I realised that people with sight can only see the world [in a 180-degree view], while those without sight are able to see the world [in] 360 degrees". In 2015, he received the Padma Shri Award, and was appointed to be the Chairperson for Sangit Natya Academy by Indian Government.

Awards and accolades
 Chair Person of Sangeet Natak Academy since 2015
 Padma Shri Award in Art field by Indian Government, 2015
 Sangeet Natak Academy Uttar Pradesh felicitated him with "Safdar Hashmi Puraskaar, 2001" for the contribution in the field of theatre
 Performed "Kabeer" at Lok Sabha on 4 May 2005
 V.Shantaram Samman of Maharashtra Rajya Hindi Sahitya Academy, 2008
 Performed "Vivekanand" at Rashtrapati Bhavan on 27 April 2013
 Performed "[Mono Act on life of Soordas]" at Rashtrapati Bhavan on 11 April 2015
 Performed in World Hindi Conference at Paramaribo, Suriname on 6–9 June 2003
 Served as expert committee member of Ministry of Human Resource Development (India) for 2 years
 Performed in World Hindi Conference at Johannesburg, South Africa on 22–24 September 2012
 As member of Central Board of Film Certification for 4 years

Discs and albums

References

External links 
 

Indian male singers
Living people
1961 births
People from Raipur district
Recipients of the Padma Shri in arts
People from Maharashtra